PICMG, or PCI Industrial Computer Manufacturers Group, is a consortium of over 140 companies. Founded in 1994, the group was originally formed to adapt PCI technology for use in high-performance telecommunications, military, and industrial computing applications, but its work has grown to include newer technologies. PICMG is distinct from the similarly named and adjacently-focused PCI Special Interest Group (PCI-SIG).

PICMG currently focuses on developing and implementing specifications and guidelines for open standardsbased computer architectures from a wide variety of interconnects.

Background 
PICMG is a standards development organization in the embedded computing industry. Members work collaboratively to develop new specifications and enhancements to existing ones. The members benefit from participating in standards development, gain early access to leading-edge technology, and forging relationships with thought leaders and suppliers in the industry.

The original PICMG mission was to provide extensions to the PCI standard developed by PCI-SIG for a range of applications. The organization's collaborations eventually expanded to include a variety of interconnect technologies for industrial computing and telecommunications. PICMG's specifications are used in a wide variety of industries including industrial automation, military, aerospace, telecommunications, medical, gaming, transportation, physics/research, test and measurement, energy, drone/robotics, and general embedded computing.

In 2011, PICMG completed its transfer of assets from the Communications Platforms Trade Association (CP-TA). Since 2006, CP-TA had been a collaboration of communications vendors, developing interoperability testing requirements, methodologies, and procedures based on open specifications from PICMG, The Linux Foundation, and the Service Availability Forum. PICMG has continued the educational and marketing outreach formerly conducted by members of the CP-TA marketing work group.

the benefits of open specifications and standards include multiple sources, scalability and upgrades, a large ecosystem of interoperable products, proven and tested designs, etc. But they should not be confused with open source. Open source groups tend to focus on specific product designs where even the Gerber files, schematics, and mechanical drawings are included. This lends itself to monochrome, commodity products with little differentiation. Open specification/open standard groups on the other hand define focus on common interfaces for interoperable products rather than finished products. Multiple vendors contribute to the base definitions and interfaces, but the implementation varies greatly. The result is a variety of interoperable products with a wide range of applications.

Specification naming convention 
For many years, PICMG used a numerical naming convention with specification being referred to as “PICMG X.YY”. Where X was used denoted differing form factors ("1" for slot card based single board computers, "2" for CompactPCI and "3" for AdvancedTCA) while YY was used to indicate incremental changes, option definitions or slight variation of a specification form its core specification. In 2003, PICMG added an acronym-based naming convention for its specifications to yield better results from internet search engines. Specifications are now often named ABCD.X  where ABCD is an acronym of the specification. In this naming convention, base or main specification are denote with X=0 (i.e. ABCD.0) and PICMG subsidiary specifications are denoted X>0. PICMG subsidiary specifications represent how various options or variations of a based specification should be handled.

Adopted specifications 

PICMG 1.0  PCI/ISA
PICMG 1.1  PCI/ISA Bridging
PICMG 1.2  PCI only
PICMG 1.3  SHB Express
PICMG 2.0  CompactPCI
PICMG 2.1  CompactPCI Hotswap
PICMG 2.2  CompactPCI VME64x
PICMG 2.3  CompactPCI PMC I/O
PICMG 2.4  CompactPCI IP I/O
PICMG 2.5  CompactPCI Telephony
PICMG 2.7  Dual CompactPCI
PICMG 2.9  CompactPCI Management
PICMG 2.10  CompactPCI Keying
PICMG 2.11  CompactPCI Power Interface
PICMG 2.12  CompactPCI Software Interoperability
PICMG 2.14  CompactPCI Multicomputing
PICMG 2.15  CompactPCI PTMC
PICMG 2.16  CompactPCI Packet Switching Backplane (PSB)
PICMG 2.17  CompactPCI Starfabric
PICMG 2.18  CompactPCI RapidIO
PICMG 2.20  CompactPCI Serial Mesh
PICMG 2.30  CompactPCI PlusIO
CPCI-S.0  CompactPCI Serial
CPCI-S.1  CompactPCI Serial for Space
PICMG 3.0  AdvancedTCA Base
PICMG 3.1  AdvancedTCA Ethernet
PICMG 3.2  AdvancedTCA Infiniband
PICMG 3.3  AdvancedTCA StarFabric
PICMG 3.4  AdvancedTCA PCI Express
PICMG 3.5  AdvancedTCA RapidIO
PICMG 3.7  AdvancedTCA Extensions
AMC.0  AdvancedMC Mezzanine Module
AMC.1  AdvancedMC PCI Express and AS
AMC.2  AdvancedMC Ethernet
AMC.3  AdvancedMC Storage
AMC.4  AdvancedMC Serial RapidIO
IRTM.0  Intelligent Rear Transition Module
SFP.0  System Fabric Plane
SFP.1  iTDM
EXP.0  CompactPCI Express
COM.0  Computer on Module
CDG  COM Design Guide
MTCA.0  MicroTCA
MTCA.1  Air-cooled rugged MicroTCA
MTCA.3  Hardened conduction-cooled MicroTCA
MTCA.4  MicroTCA Enhancements for Rear I/O & Precision Timing

Design Guides 
Physics Design Guide for Clocks, Gates & Triggers in Instrumentation

Current standing committees 
These groups represent standing committees which may result in new subsidiary specification, revisions to existing specification, reference materials for future PICMG committees or new PICMG specifications.

MicroTCA NG
COM-HPC
COM-HPC Mini
ModBlox7
COM Express Rev 3.1
Industrial IoT

ASI specifications 
The following specifications were developed by the ASI SIG which has now disbanded and has transferred these documents to PICMG.  
	
ASI Core  Advanced Switching Core Architecture Specification
ASI PI-8  ASI Protocol Interface No. 8
ASI SDT  ASI Socket Data Interface
ASI SQP  ASI Simple Queuing Protocol
ASI SLS  ASI Simple Load/Store (SLS) Specification
ASI Portal  ASI Portal Specification

Joint projects 

The PICMG has active liaisons with several industry bodies including DMTF.

See also 
 PCI-SIG
 Eurocard (printed circuit board)

References

External links 
 

Standards organizations in the United States
Technology consortia
Organizations established in 1994
Open standards
Peripheral Component Interconnect